Ryan Christopher Dull (born October 2, 1989) is an American professional baseball pitcher for the High Point Rockers of the Atlantic League of Professional Baseball. He has played in Major League Baseball (MLB) for the Oakland Athletics, New York Yankees and Toronto Blue Jays.

Career

Early career

Dull played high school baseball at East Forsyth High School in Kernersville, North Carolina where he is in the hall of fame for athletics and college baseball at the University of North Carolina at Asheville.

Draft and minor leagues

The Oakland Athletics selected Dull in the 32nd round of the 2012 Major League Baseball draft, and he signed. 

Dull made his professional debut that season with the AZL Athletics and he was promoted to the Vermont Lake Monsters in July. In 31.2 total relief innings pitched between the two teams, he was 5–1 with a 2.56 ERA. In 2013, he played for the Beloit Snappers, Stockton Ports, and Midland RockHounds, compiling a combined 2–5 record and 2.40 ERA in 45 total relief appearances, and in 2014, he pitched with Midland, going 5–5 with a 2.88 ERA in 40 relief appearances. Dull spent 2015 with Midland and the Nashville Sounds, pitching to a combined 3–2 record and 0.74 ERA in 61 innings pitched in relief.

Oakland Athletics

Dull was called up to the majors for the first time on September 1, 2015, and made his major league debut that night, pitching one inning of relief against the Los Angeles Angels of Anaheim. Dull finished the 2015 season with 13 appearances, compiling a 1–2 record and 4.24 ERA. In 2016, Dull began the season in Oakland's bullpen and was a mainstay, appearing in 70 games while going 5–5 with a 2.42 ERA. In 2017, Dull was placed on the disabled list at the end of May due to a right knee strain, and he did not return until late July. In 49 relief appearances for Oakland, he was 2–2 with a 5.14 ERA. Dull began 2018 with Oakland, but was optioned to Nashville in May. He pitched most of the season in AAA, appearing in 28 games for Oakland. 

He was designated for assignment on August 3, 2019.

On August 5, 2019, the Giants announced they had claimed Dull off waivers.  On August 12, Dull was designated for assignment.

New York Yankees
On August 14, 2019, Dull was claimed off waivers by the New York Yankees. On September 15, Dull was designated for assignment by New York.

Toronto Blue Jays
On September 18, 2019, Dull was claimed off waivers by the Toronto Blue Jays. After being designated for assignment on September 20, he cleared waivers and was assigned to Triple A on September 24. On September 25, the Blue Jays selected Dull's contract. Dull re-signed with the Blue Jays on a minor league deal on January 18, 2020. He became a free agent on November 2, 2020.

Winnipeg Goldeyes
On January 20, 2021, Dull signed with the Winnipeg Goldeyes of the American Association of Professional Baseball. However, on May 5, 2021, he left the Goldeyes, having never played a game for them.

Seattle Mariners
On May 5, 2021, Dull signed a minor league contract with the Seattle Mariners organization. Dull pitched to a 6.06 ERA in 28 appearances for the Triple-A Tacoma Rainiers before he was released on August 12, 2021.

High Point Rockers
On August 24, 2021, Dull signed with the High Point Rockers of the Atlantic League of Professional Baseball. He became a free agent following the season. On April 9, 2022, Dull re-signed with the Rockers for the 2022 season.

References

External links

UNC Asheville Bulldogs

1989 births
Living people
American expatriate baseball players in Canada
Arizona League Athletics players
Baseball players from Winston-Salem, North Carolina
Beloit Snappers players
High Point Rockers players
Las Vegas Aviators players
Major League Baseball pitchers
Mesa Solar Sox players
Midland RockHounds players
Nashville Sounds players
New York Yankees players
Oakland Athletics players
Sacramento River Cats players
Scranton/Wilkes-Barre RailRiders players
Stockton Ports players
Tacoma Rainiers players
Toronto Blue Jays players
UNC Asheville Bulldogs baseball players
Vermont Lake Monsters players
Mat-Su Miners players